The 2014 ICC World Cricket League Division Three was a cricket divisional tournament organised by International Cricket Council. It formed part of the ICC World Cricket League (WCL) and qualification for the 2019 World Cup. The top two teams in the tournament Nepal and Uganda qualified for the 2015 WCL Division Two tournament, to be held in Namibia, while the bottom two teams United States and Bermuda were relegated to the 2016 WCL Division Four tournament,.

Malaysia hosted the event, from 23 to 30 October 2014.  It was originally to be held in Uganda, but in September 2014 the ICC shifted the tournament to Malaysia due to security concerns, at the suggestion of the Malaysian Cricket Association. Players from Bermuda and the United States had indicated they would not take part in the tournament if it were held in Uganda.

Teams
The teams that took part in the tournament were decided according to the results of the 2014 World Cup Qualifier, the 2013 WCL Division Three, and the 2014 WCL Division Four.

Venues
Following three venues were used for the tournament.
 Kinrara Academy Oval, Kuala Lumpur
 Bayuemas Oval, Kuala Lumpur
 Selangor Turf Club, Selangor

Squads

Fixtures

All times are Malaysia Standard Time (UTC+08:00)

Round robin

Points table

Matches

Playoffs

5th place playoff

3rd place playoff

Final

Statistics

Most runs

Source: Cricinfo

Most wickets

Source: Cricinfo

Final placings

After the conclusion of the tournament the teams were distributed as follows:

References

External links
 Asian Cricket Council

2014, 3
2014 in cricket
Cricket in Malaysia
2014 in Malaysian sport
International cricket competitions in 2014–15